DaKAR (backronym of Da King of Afrikan Rap) is the second studio album by South African hip hop recording artist and poet Kwesta. The album was released digitally on November 25, 2013, with physical copies being released the following year.

It is Kwesta's first album to be released on Urbantainment, after departing from Buttabing Entertainment. The album serves as the first installment in Kwesta's DaKAR album series and is a prequel to DaKAR II, which was released on February 26, 2016.

Background 
DaKAR is a self-titled acronym whereby Kwesta proclaims himself as "Da King of Afrikan Rap".

Track listing

References 

2013 albums
Kwesta albums